Pierluigi Balducci (born 3 October 1971) is an Italian jazz musician and composer, specializing in electric bass.

He performed at numerous festivals and Jazz clubs throughout Europe and Asia and has collaborated with Ernst Reijseger, Luciano Biondini, Paul McCandless, John Taylor, Gabriele Mirabassi, Javier Girotto, Nuevo Tango Ensamble. He wrote the sound track for Catherine Breillat's film Fat Girl, which was shown at the Berlin International Film Festival (2001).

Discography
 Niebla (Splasc(h) 2000)
 Il peso delle nuvole (Splasc(h), 2003)
 Leggero (Dodicilune, 2007)
 Stupor Mundi (Dodicilune, 2008)
 Blue from Heaven (Dodicilune, 2012)
 Evansiana (Dodicilune, 2017)
 Electric Wood (2020)

Bibliography 
2009 – Pierluigi Balducci: Bach on the bass – The first cello suite transcribed and fingered for 5 and 4 string electric bass (Salatino Edizioni Musicali)

References

Sources

External links
 Pierluigi Balducci at AllAboutJazz

Italian jazz musicians
1971 births
People from Bari
Italian bass guitarists
Male bass guitarists
Living people
21st-century bass guitarists
21st-century Italian male musicians
Male jazz musicians